Samut Prakan Football Club (sometimes spelled Samutprakan)  (Thai สโมสรฟุตบอลจังหวัดสมุทรปราการ) is a Thai professional football club based in Samut Prakan Province, Thailand. The club is currently playing in the Thai League 3 Bangkok metropolitan region.

Honours

Domestic leagues
Regional League Division 2 Central & East
 Winners (1) : 2009
 Runners-up (1) : 2010
Thai League 4 Bangkok Metropolitan Region
 Runners-up (1) : 2017

Stadium and locations

Seasons

Club officials

External links
 Official Website

Association football clubs established in 2004
Football clubs in Thailand
Sport in Samut Prakan province
2004 establishments in Thailand